Opera North is an opera company based at The Grand Theatre, Leeds. This article covers the period between the departure of Paul Daniel (music director 1990–1997) and the arrival of Richard Farnes (music director 2004–present).

History 
During the seasons 1997–8 and 1998–9, while the company was looking for a successor to Daniel, Elgar Howarth held the title of Music Advisor. The company mounted ten new productions and seven revivals, led by a total of eighteen different conductors, among them Steuart Bedford, Wyn Davies, Oliver von Dohnányi, Paul Goodwin and András Ligeti, as well as Howarth himself, Paul Daniel, Richard Farnes and Steven Sloane, who became Music Director in 1999. When he departed in 2002, Sloane had conducted a further ten new productions and two revivals, while fifteen other conductors, including Stephen Barlow, Harry Bicket and David Parry were also employed by the company.

Another interregnum (2002–4) ensued before the appointment of Sloane's successor, Richard Farnes, with new names on the podium including Martin André, Martyn Brabbins, Frédéric Chaslin, William Lacey, Sebastian Lang-Lessing, Grant Llewellyn and Mark Shanahan.

There was one world premiere during this period – Simon Holt's The Nightingale's to Blame – and a number of rarities: Martinů's Julietta, Schumann's Genoveva, Verdi's Giovanna d'Arco, Handel's Radamisto and Shostakovich's operetta Paradise Moscow. The Bartered Bride was successfully updated to the Prague Spring period, Tristan und Isolde was semi-staged at Leeds Town Hall and elsewhere, and musical theatre was represented by George Gershwin's Of Thee I Sing and Stephen Sondheim's Sweeney Todd.

The unusual final segment of the 2003–4 season attracted a great deal of interest and a number of awards. Under the title "Eight Little Greats", the company presented eight one-act operas, each by a different composer. Two were performed per night and additionally there were two-opera matinées on Saturdays, all in various combinations. Operas could be booked individually or as double-bills. A company of 21 principals was assembled, and most of them appeared in more than one of the operas. Four operas were directed by David Pountney and four by Christopher Alden; three were conducted by Martin André and four by David Parry; Johan Engels was responsible for all of the sets and three different costume designers were engaged.

Repertoire 
Below is a list of main stage operas performed by the company during this period.

References

Sources 

Opera North annual review 2004–2005

See also 
 Opera North: history and repertoire, seasons 1978–79 to 1980–81
 Opera North: history and repertoire, seasons 1981–82 to 1989–90
 Opera North: history and repertoire, seasons 1990–91 to 1996–97
Opera North: history and repertoire, seasons 2004–

Opera North
Opera-related lists